Louise Huntington (November 1, 1904 in Dallas, Texas – June 2, 1997 in Summit, New Jersey) was an American stage and screen actress appearing on Broadway in the 1920s and on screen in the 1930s.

Huntington's film career included silent movies as well as some of the first sound productions. The Viking, in which she appeared in 1931, was the first Canadian-produced film to include sound. 

On Broadway, Huntington appeared in The World We Make (1939), Pygmalion (1938), Captain Jinks of the Horse Marines (1938), Elizabeth the Queen (1930), The Nut Farm (1929), and The Constant Nymph (1926). Huntington's stage career took her overseas, including being part of a troupe that toured Africa in 1928. Later in life Huntington continued performing on stage and on television. She also directed theater and continued to act in commercials into her 80s. She was married to Robert Roberts, whom she later divorced. Her second husband was Sydney Houston who died in the mid-1970s. She died in Summit, New Jersey in 1997.

Selected filmography
Three Rogues (1931) ... aka Not Exactly Gentlemen. Directed by Benjamin Stoloff and co-starring Fay Wray. Huntington played Bronco's girl
The Viking (1931) Directed by Varick Frissell and George Melford. Huntington played Mary Joe. Director Varick Frissell, cinematographer Alexander G. Penrod, and almost all the film crew were killed on March 15, 1931, when the sealing ship SS Viking, from which they were shooting additional footage, exploded in ice off the Horse Islands on the northern Newfoundland coast. Huntington was not present on this shoot day.
Fair Warning (1931) Directed by Alfred L. Werker and co-starring George O'Brien. Huntington played Kate Cumberland
The Man Who Came Back (1931) Directed by Raoul Walsh. Huntington played Clarice (Stephen's first wife)

Louise Huntington had two Daughters.  Lynn Roberts Roalsen. DOB 2-24-1933 living in Las Vegas Nevada. She has 3 grandchildren. Diana Huntington Lejuez.  DOB 1-28-1937 living in Summit New Jersey.
She has 8 Grand Children.

Selected Broadway credits
The World We Make [Original, Play, Drama] Head Nurse; Neighbor November 20, 1939 - January 27, 1940
Pygmalion [Revival, Play, Comedy] Mrs. Higgins Jan 25, 1938 - February 12, 1938
Captain Jinks of the Horse Marines [Revival, Play, Comedy] Mrs. Jinks Jan 25, 1938 - February 12, 1938
Elizabeth the Queen [Original, Play, Drama, History] Lady-in-Waiting November 3, 1930 - Mar 1931
The Nut Farm [Original, Play, Comedy] Agatha Sliscomb October 14, 1929 - November 1929
The Constant Nymph [Original, Play] Paulina Sanger December 9, 1926 - April 1927

References

External links

1904 births
1997 deaths
American stage actresses
American film actresses
20th-century American actresses
20th-century American singers
Actresses from Dallas